Gibbium aequinoctiale, the smooth spider beetle, is a species of spider beetle in the family Ptinidae. It is found in the Caribbean, Europe and Northern Asia (excluding China), Central America, North America, and South America. It has been reported from many parts of the world as Gibbium psylloides.

References

Further reading

 
 
 
 

Bostrichoidea
Articles created by Qbugbot
Beetles described in 1854